The Kanyara and Mantharta languages form a western branch of the Pama–Nyungan family.

References

 
Southwest Pama–Nyungan languages
Indigenous Australian languages in Western Australia